Robert Worden Jr. (March 10, 1809May 5, 1893) was a Michigan politician.

Early life
Robert Worden Jr. was born on March 10, 1809, to parents Robert and Lucy Worden. In August 1832, Worden married Orpha M. Fairbank in Eaton, New York. On April 1, 1834, Worden arrived in Michigan from Fairport, New York, in a covered wagon with his family. There, Worden built a log cabin. As early settlers in Michigan, Worden's party had trouble dealing with the outdoors, particularly with the pest known as the deer mouse. Worden procured a cat from Adrian, Michigan, to help deal with this pest.

Career
Worden was a farmer. In 1836, Worden served as a Pittsford school inspector, alongside Urias Treadwell and Sidney S. Ford. Worden served as treasurer of Hillsdale County from 1848 to 1852. On November 2, 1852, Worden was elected to the Michigan House of Representatives where he represented the Hillsdale County 3rd district from January 5, 1853, to December 31, 1854. During his time in the legislature, Worden lived in Hudson, Michigan. Later, around 1888, Worden lived in Owosso, Michigan. In 1872, Worden served as president of the Hillsdale County Agricultural Society.

Personal life
Worden and his wife together had four children. In 1881, his wife died. Worden was a Freemason.

Death
Worden died on May 5, 1893, at his residence in Grand Rapids, Michigan, after a year of illness. He was interred at Goodrich Cemetery in Pittsford.

References

1809 births
1893 deaths
American Freemasons
People of the Michigan Territory
Burials in Michigan
County treasurers in Michigan
Farmers from Michigan
People from Hillsdale County, Michigan
Democratic Party members of the Michigan House of Representatives
19th-century American politicians